Chaupai may refer to:
 Chaupai (Sikhism), a Sikh prayer
 Chaupai (poetry), a style of medieval Hindi poetry
 Chaupai, Unnao, a village in Uttar Pradesh, India